Wilhelm Gegenfurtner is a German Roman Catholic priest.

He was born in Teisnach, Lower Bavaria, and in 1974 became a Roman Catholic priest in the Roman Catholic Diocese of Regensburg. His work as a priest was at Geisenfeld, at the University of Regensburg. He was awarded the Order of Merit of the Federal Republic of Germany in August 2005.

References

21st-century German Roman Catholic priests
Recipients of the Cross of the Order of Merit of the Federal Republic of Germany
Living people
Year of birth missing (living people)
20th-century German Roman Catholic priests
Clergy from Bavaria